John Jabez Thurston (11 October 1888 – 8 January 1960) was an independent member of the House of Commons of Canada. He was born in Fenelon Township, Ontario and became a farmer.

He was elected to Parliament at the Victoria, Ontario riding in the 1921 general election. After serving his only term, the 14th Canadian Parliament, Thurston did not seek re-election in the 1925 vote and was succeeded by Thomas Hubert Stinson of the Conservatives. In the 1926 election, Thurston campaigned at Victoria riding under the Progressive party but was defeated by Stinson.

Electoral record

|-
  
|Conservative
|Thomas Hubert Stinson   
|align="right"|9,070 

|}

|-
 
|Independent
|John Jabez Thurston   
|align="right"|8,019  
  
|Conservative
|Thomas Hubert Stinson 
|align="right"|7,816    
|}

External links
 
 John Jabez Thurston at Linked Parliamentary Data (LiPaD)

1888 births
1960 deaths
Canadian farmers
Independent MPs in the Canadian House of Commons
Members of the House of Commons of Canada from Ontario